Elections to Londonderry Borough Council were held on 17 May 1967, amidst the Northern Ireland civil rights movement.

The election would be the last to the unreformed Londonderry Borough Council, with local government in Northern Ireland being reformed from 1969 onwards. The council elected was the last with a Unionist majority. Albert Anderson continued as Mayor.

The Northern Ireland Labour Party stood for the first time in local elections in the city.  It made a particularly strong showing under its local party chairman, Willie Breslin, with the party taking 30% of the vote. Due to the electoral system however the party failed to win any seats.  The Ulster Unionist Party stood in both wards with a unionist majority, and the Nationalist Party only in the one ward with a nationalist majority.  Two independent candidates also stood.

Results 
The final result saw no change from the previous election, which had been held in 1964 and in which no seats had been contested.  Two of the Nationalist Party councillors were new, with Mary Harrigan being the first woman to serve on the council since 1926.

The 1969 report by Lord Cameron into "Disturbances in Northern Ireland" (paragraph 134) gives the total electorate as 23,210 rather than 23,312, and divides the 23,210 into 14,429 Catholic voters and 8,781 Other voters.

Ward results

North Ward 

The 1969 report by Lord Cameron into "Disturbances in Northern Ireland" (paragraph 134) divides the total ward electorate of 6,476 into 2,530 Catholic voters and 3,946 Other voters.

South Ward 

The 1969 report by Lord Cameron into "Disturbances in Northern Ireland" (paragraph 134) gives the total ward electorate as 11,185 rather than 11,287, and divides the 11,185 into 10,047 Catholic voters and 1,138 Other voters.

Waterside Ward 

The 1969 report by Lord Cameron into "Disturbances in Northern Ireland" (paragraph 134) divides the total ward electorate of 5,549 into 1,852 Catholic voters and 3,697 Other voters.

Notes 

 1. Voters in North and South wards could each vote for up to 6 candidates and voters in Waterside ward could vote for up to 3 candidates. As a result totals for registered electors and turnout do not bear a direct relation to votes.

 2. Two aldermen were elected unopposed in each of the North ward and the South ward and one alderman was elected unopposed in the Waterside ward.

 3. The Derry Journal gives 25,550 as the total of 17,198 (North ward) and 8,337 (Waterside ward).

References

Derry City Council elections
Londonderry
20th century in Derry (city)